2Africa is an international submarine telecommunications cable that  circumnavigates the coastline of Africa to interconnect Europe and the Middle East. It is funded by a consortium of companies include several telcos and Meta. The system will be one of the first to use spatial division multiplexing (SDM1).

2Africa pass from Europe through the Atlantic Ocean and Indian Ocean, and then back into Europe via the Red Sea and the Mediterranean Sea.

The system is to be constructed by Alcatel Submarine Networks. and is intended to be operational in 2023. On 9 December 2022, the cable landed in South Africa, which will be formally launched by MTN Group on 13 December 2022.

See also
List of international submarine communications cables

References

External links 
 
 Press Release with Map on Businesswire
 Facebook Engineering 2Africa page

Submarine communications cables in the Indian Ocean
Submarine communications cables in the South Atlantic Ocean
Submarine communications cables in the Mediterranean Sea
Submarine communications cables in the Red Sea